The teams competing in Group 2 of the 2015 UEFA European Under-21 Championships qualifying competition were Estonia, Denmark, Andorra, Slovenia, Bulgaria and Russia.

The ten group winners and the four best second-placed teams advanced to the play-offs.

Standings

Results and fixtures
All times are CEST (UTC+02:00) during summer and CET (UTC+01:00) during winter.

Goalscorers
 5 goals

  Lasse Vigen Christensen
  Konstantin Bazelyuk
  Elvis Bratanović

 4 goals

  Aleksandar Kolev
  Yussuf Poulsen
  Kenneth Zohore
  Andraž Šporar

 3 goals

  Todor Nedelev
  Lucas Andersen
  Nicolai Brock-Madsen
  Pierre-Emile Højbjerg
  Jannik Vestergaard
  Denis Davydov
  Vladimir Obukhov
  Enej Jelenič
  Haris Vučkić

 2 goals

  Ivaylo Chochev
  Edisson Jordanov
  Radoslav Kirilov
  Nicolaj Thomsen
  Christoffer Remmer
  Pavel Mogilevets
  Aleksei Nikitin
  Dino Hotić

 1 goal

  Luigi San Nicolas
  Tsvetelin Chunchukov
  Milen Gamakov
  Anton Karachanakov
  Zhivko Petkov
  Stefan Velkov
  Uffe Bech
  Emil Berggren
  Andreas Christensen
  Andreas Cornelius
  Riza Durmisi
  Bassel Jradi
  Jens Jønsson
  Hannes Anier
  Nikita Baranov
  Maksim Gussev
  Aleksandr Kulinitš
  Frank Liivak
  Maksim Lipin
  Maksim Podholjuzin
  Artur Rättel
  Madis Vihmann
  Dzhamaldin Khodzhaniyazov
  Aleksandr Korotayev
  Arshak Koryan
  Aleksandr Kozlov
  Magomed Mitrishev
  Georgi Nurov
  Serder Serderov
  Žan Benedičič
  Gaber Dobrovoljc
  Luka Krajnc
  Mitja Lotrič
  Žan Majer
  Nemanja Mitrović
  Matej Pučko
  Petar Stojanović
  Benjamin Verbič
  Blaž Vrhovec

 1 own goal
  Asen Georgiev (against Slovenia)

References

External links
Standings and fixtures at UEFA.com

Group 2